Baviaanskloof Mega Reserve is a protected area in the Eastern Cape Province, South Africa.

Characteristics
The Baviaanskloof - (Dutch for "Valley of Baboons") - lies between the Baviaanskloof and Kouga mountain ranges. The easternmost point of the valley is some 95 km NW of the coastal city of Port Elizabeth.

largest protected area in South Africa. The Baviaanskloof Forest Reserve was established in 1920. It also includes the Groendal Nature Reserve and Formosa Nature Reserve, and encompasses private land.

The Baviaanskloof area is one of outstanding natural beauty, owing to its spectacular land forms, a diverse array of plants and wide variety of animals. The area is part of the Cape Floristic Region World Heritage Site as of 2004.

References

External links
 Baviaanskloof at Eastern Cape Parks
 Friends Baviaanskloof Wilderness Area (FoBWA)
 Eastern Cape Parks

Eastern Cape Provincial Parks
Protected areas of the Eastern Cape
1920 establishments in South Africa
Protected areas established in 1920
Albany thickets